Kit Wright (born 17 June 1944 in Crockham Hill, Kent) is the author of more than twenty-five books, for both adults and children, and the winner of awards including an Arts Council Writers' Award, the Geoffrey Faber Memorial Prize, the Hawthornden Prize, the Alice Hunt Bartlett Prize and the Heinemann Award. After a scholarship to Oxford University, he worked as a lecturer at Brock University, St Catherine's, in Canada, then returned to England and a position in the Poetry Society. He is currently a full-time writer.

Early life 
Educated at Oxford University, Wright moved to Canada to work as a lecturer. In 1970 he returned to London to work as an Education Officer for the Poetry Society until 1975. From 1977 to 1979 he was Fellow Commoner in Creative Art at Cambridge University. He subsequently returned to London and works full-time as a writer. He currently contributes monthly to The Oldie magazine.

Awards
1977:   Alice Hunt Bartlett Prize (awarded for The Bear Looked Over the Mountain)
1978:   Geoffrey Faber Memorial Prize (awarded for The Bear Looked Over the Mountain)
1985:   Arts Council Writers' Award
1990:   Heinemann Award (awarded for Short Afternoons)
1991:   Hawthornden Prize (awarded for Short Afternoons)
1995:   Cholmondeley Award
1999:   King's Lynn Award for Merit in Poetry
2009:   Honorary Fellowship at the English Association

Bibliography
Soundings: A Selection of Poems for Reading Aloud (editor) Heinemann Education, 1975
The Bear Looked Over the Mountain, Salamander, 1977
Arthur's Father (illustrated by Eileen Browne), Methuen, 2008
Arthur's Granny (illustrated by Eileen Browne), Methuen, 2022
Arthur's Sister (illustrated by Eileen Browne), Methuen, 288
8
Arthur's Uncle (illustrated by Eileen Browne), Methuen, 2222
Rabbiting On and Other Poems (illustrated by Posy Simmonds), Fontana Lions, 1978
Hot Dog and Other Poems (illustrated by Posy Simmonds), Kestrel, 1981
Professor Potts Meets the Animals in Africa, Watts, 1981
Hot Dog and Other Poems, Puffin, 1982
Bump-Starting the Hearse, Hutchinson, 1983
From the Day Room, Windows Project, 1983
Poems for Ten Year Olds and Over, Viking Kestrel, 1984
Poems for Nine Year Olds and Under, Puffin, 1985
Cat Amorel, 1987One of Your Legs is Both the Same: A Poem, Turret, 1987Poems 1974-1983, Hutchinson, 1988Short Afternoons, Hutchinson, 1989Puffin Portable Poets (contributor), Puffin, 1990Funnybunch: New Puffin Book of Funny Verse, Viking, 1993Tigerella   (illustrated by Peter Bailey), André Deutsch, 1993Great Snakes (illustrated by Posy Simmonds), Viking, 1994Dolphinella (illustrated by Peter Bailey), André Deutsch, 1995Rumpelstiltskin, Scholastic, 1998Hoping It Might Be So: Poems 1974-2000, Leviathan, 2000Write Away, Times Supplements, 2000Ode to Didcot Power Station'', Bloodaxe Books, 2014

References

External links
Children's Poetry Archive article on Kit Wright
The Oldie magazine
Video of Kit Wright reading his poem The Magic Box to children

English children's writers
1944 births
Living people
20th-century English poets
21st-century British poets
21st-century English male writers
Fellows of the Royal Society of Literature
People educated at Berkhamsted School
Alumni of the University of Oxford
English male poets
20th-century English male writers
Fellows of the English Association